Northern Busway may refer to:

Northern Busway, Auckland, New Zealand
Northern Busway, Brisbane, Australia